Lennox Llewellyn Giddy (2 May 1869 – 16 June 1942) was a South African cricketer. He played in seven first-class matches for Eastern Province from 1890/91 to 1903/04.

See also
 List of Eastern Province representative cricketers

References

External links
 

1869 births
1942 deaths
South African cricketers
Eastern Province cricketers
Sportspeople from Qonce